Acharya Ravisena was a seventh century Digambara Jain Acharya, who wrote Padmapurana (Jain Ramayana) in Sanskrit in 678 AD. In Padmapurana, he mentions about a ceremony called suttakantha, which means the thread hanging from neck.

Ravishena and his Padmapurana has been mentioned in Kuvalayamala of Udyotana Suri (Vikram 835) and Jinasena in his Harivansha Purana (Vikram 840).

Padmapurana is said to follow Paumachariya, although it sometimes departs from it. In the Jain tradition, Rama is a Balabhadra, who is non-violent. According to Padma Purana, Ravana was killed by Lakshmana. After having rules for many years, Rama, became a muni and eventually attained nirvana.

Notes

References

External links

Jain acharyas
Indian Jain monks
7th-century Indian Jains
7th-century Jain monks
7th-century Indian monks